KIKS-FM (101.5 FM) is a radio station broadcasting a Country format. Licensed to Iola, Kansas, United States, it serves the Pittsburg market.  The station is currently owned by Iola Broadcasting, Inc..

External links

Country radio stations in the United States
IKS-FM